S-Nitroso-N-acetylpenicillamine (SNAP) is the organosulfur compound with the formula ONSC(CH3)2CH(NHAc)CO2H.  It is a green solid.

SNAP is an S-nitrosothiol and is used as a model for the general class of S-nitrosothiols which have received much attention in biochemistry because nitric oxide and some organic nitroso derivatives serve as signaling molecules in living systems, especially related to vasodilation.
SNAP is derived from the amino acid penicillamine. S-Nitrosoglutathione is a related agent.

References

Sulfur compounds
Nitroso compounds
Secondary amino acids
Amides